A Borstal was a type of youth detention centre in the United Kingdom, several member states of the Commonwealth and the Republic of Ireland. In India, such a detention centre is known as a Borstal school.

Borstals were run by HM Prison Service and were intended to reform young offenders. The word is sometimes used loosely to apply to other kinds of youth institutions and reformatories, such as approved schools and youth detention centres. The court sentence was officially called "Borstal training". Borstals were originally for offenders under 21, but in the 1930s the maximum age was increased to 23. The Criminal Justice Act 1982 abolished the Borstal system in the UK, replacing Borstals with youth custody centres.

In India, Borstal schools are used for the imprisonment of minors. As of 31 December 2014, there were twenty functioning Borstal schools in India, with a combined total capacity of 2,108 inmates.

History

United Kingdom

The Gladstone Committee (1895) first proposed the concept of the borstal, wishing to separate youths from older convicts in adult prisons. It was the task of Sir Evelyn Ruggles-Brise (1857–1935), a prison commissioner, to introduce the system, and the first such institution was established at Borstal Prison in a village called Borstal, near Rochester, Kent, England, in 1902. The system was developed on a national basis and formalised in the Prevention of Crime Act 1908.

The regimen in these institutions was designed to be "educational rather than punitive", but it was highly regulated, with a focus on routine, discipline and authority during the early years. Borstal institutions were originally designed to offer education, regular work and discipline, though one commentator has claimed that "more often than not they were breeding grounds for bullies and psychopaths."

The Criminal Justice Act 1982 officially abolished the borstal system in the UK, introducing youth custody centres instead. As society had changed the system was then already outdated especially since the late 1960s and early 1970s, with many borstals being closed and replaced with institutions called Detention Centres and, from 1972, also with Community Service Order sentences.

Corporal punishment
Except in Northern Ireland, the only corporal punishment officially available in borstals was the birch for mutiny or assaulting an officer, and this could be imposed only by the visiting magistrates, subject in each case to the personal approval of the Home Secretary, just as in adult prisons. Only male inmates over 18 might be so punished. This power was very rarely used – there were only seven birching cases in borstals in the 10 years to 1936. This birching power was available only in England and Wales (not in Scottish borstals). Caning as a more day-to-day punishment was used in the single borstal in Northern Ireland but was not authorised in Scotland or England and Wales. Confusion on this matter arises perhaps because in approved schools, a quite different kind of youth institution based more on the open "boarding school" model, caning was an official punishment for young people (maximum age 19).

Commonwealth
A similar system under the name "borstal" or "borstal school" has also been introduced in several other Commonwealth countries.

India 

In India, nine states, namely Himachal Pradesh, Jharkhand, Karnataka, Kerala, Maharashtra, Punjab, Rajasthan, Tamil Nadu, and Telangana, have borstal schools in their respective jurisdictions. Tamil Nadu had the highest capacity, at 678 inmates (as of 2014). Himachal Pradesh and Kerala are the only states that have the capacity to lodge female inmates in two of their borstal schools. There are no borstal schools in any of the union territories.

Ireland

In Ireland the Criminal Justice Act, 1960 (Section 12) removed the term "borstal" from official use. This was part of a policy to broaden the system from reform and training institutions to a place of detention for youths between 17 and 21 for any sentence which carried a prison term. The only borstal in the state was based for most of its existence in Clonmel, in County Tipperary. Founded in 1906, it finally closed in 1956, when the remaining detainees were transferred to the newly established St. Patrick's Institution in Dublin. Industrial schools performed a similar function to borstals.

In popular culture

Literature
Irish writer Brendan Behan wrote of his experiences in the English borstal system in his autobiography Borstal Boy (1958). It was later adapted into play and film versions.
Alan Sillitoe's short story "The Loneliness of the Long-Distance Runner" (1959) is included in the book of the same title. A boy's period in a borstal for robbing a bakery is recounted. The film version followed in 1962 in which Tom Courtenay starred and the director was Tony Richardson.
In Roald Dahl's children's book Matilda (1988), Hortensia initially refers to the school as "borstal" on Matilda's first day.
Alan Figg's book Borstal 80 gives a personal account of time served 1980 to 1981 at Portland Borstal.

Cinema
The British film, Boys in Brown (1949) stars Richard Attenborough, Dirk Bogarde and Jack Warner. It looks at life in a borstal and the challenges faced by those who go through them.
 Scum (1977), a once banned Play for Today and its cinema remake Scum (1979) are set in a borstal. Ray Winstone, in a very early role, features in both versions.
 Young Raymond Briggs is threatened with being sent to "Borstal" by a police officer after being suspected of trying to steal "valuable billiard cues" from a golf club in the animated film Ethel & Ernest (2016).
 Scrubbers (1982) British drama film set in a girls' borstal, directed by Mai Zetterling and starring Amanda York and Chrissie Cotterill.

Television
A ninth series episode of the BBC television show Father Brown, titled "The Wayward Girls" and first broadcast in January 2022, was set in a borstal.

Dog Borstal is the title of a British television series in which dog trainers address challenging behaviour by dogs.

Music
 The British rock band Faces recorded a song (written by Rod Stewart, Ronnie Wood, and Ian McLagan) called "Borstal Boys" on their final studio album Ooh La La.
 The British punk rock band Sham 69 had a top 40 hit single with a song called "Borstal Breakout" in 1977.
 The British rock band Humble Pie recorded a song called "30 Days in the Hole" that included the lyric "Some seeds and dust, and you got Borstal."
 The British singer-songwriter Richard Thompson included a song called "I Can't Wake Up to Save My Life" on his 1994 album Mirror Blue, which included the lines "Things I done make my dreams turn bad, like borstal boys coming home to Dad", an image similar to "chickens coming home to roost".
 The German punk band Oxymoron released a track titled "Borstal" on their 1995 album "Fuck The Nineties...Here's Our Noize".
 The British synthpop band Bronski Beat featured a mince pie-eating competition in Borstal with lead singer Jimmy Somerville winning the contest in the music video of the cover song "It Ain't Necessarily So" from the album The Age of Consent.
 The Borstal is a punk rock band from Jakarta, Indonesia.
 Borstal is a heavy hardcore band from London, with Brujeria and Knuckledust members (including lead singer, Pelbu).

See also

 His Majesty's Young Offender Institution
 Young offender
 Youth detention center
 Clonmel Borstal

References

External links

Specialized "Borstal" website, contains many unsourced and questionable claims about unofficial corporal punishment, also tends to lump borstals together with Approved Schools 
Reformatory links from CorPun site devoted to corporal punishments
Archive pictures of Portland Borstal, 1920s and 1930s
"Borstal changed my life" – BBC website
27 photographs of the first Borstal, Kent, in 1902 - Modern Records Centre, University of Warwick
Photograph of borstal boys at work – National Archives
Extract from a report about girls' borstal in 1938 – National Archives
Elizabeth M. Chesser, "NEW REFORM FOR GIRL CRIMINALS; English Scheme Which Is Educational Rather Than Punitive" (article about extension of borstal system to include girls), The New York Times, 27 December 1908

Imprisonment and detention
Youth detention centers
Juvenile law
Prisons in India
Youth in the United Kingdom